The Cartier Champion Older Horse is an award in European horse racing, founded in 1991, and sponsored by Cartier SA as part of the Cartier Racing Awards. The award winner is decided by points earned in group races plus the votes cast by British racing journalists and readers of the Racing Post and The Daily Telegraph newspapers.

Records
Most successful horse (2 wins):
 Goldikova – 2009, 2010
 Enable - 2018, 2019

Leading trainer (5 wins):
 Saeed bin Suroor – Halling (1996), Swain (1998), Daylami (1999), Fantastic Light (2001), Grandera (2002)

Leading owner (5 wins):
 Godolphin – Halling (1996), Swain (1998), Daylami (1999), Fantastic Light (2001), Grandera (2002)

Winners

References

Horse racing awards